Santiago Hernán Solari Poggio (born 7 October 1976) is an Argentine professional football manager and former player who played as a left midfielder.

He spent the better part of his 16-year professional career in Spain, amassing La Liga totals of 177 matches and 17 goals mainly with Real Madrid, but also played in Italy for Inter Milan, winning 13 major titles between both teams.

Solari began working as a coach in 2013, going on to spend several years  associated with Real Madrid in different capacities.

Playing career

Club

Early career and River
Born in Rosario, Santa Fe, Solari played youth football for Newell's Old Boys and Renato Cesarini, after returning from the United States where he attended Richard Stockton College in New Jersey. He joined Club Atlético River Plate midway through the 1995–96 season, making his Primera División debut on 12 May.

Solari appeared in 24 league games in his first full campaign, helping River to both the Apertura and Clausura tournaments.

Atlético Madrid
Solari moved to Spain late in the 1999 January transfer window, signing with Atlético Madrid. He played his first La Liga game on 7 February, in a 2–1 away loss against UD Salamanca.

Solari had his best individual season in 1999–2000 when he scored six goals in 34 matches, but the Colchoneros were relegated from the top division.

Real Madrid
Subsequently, Solari moved across the city to join Real Madrid, who paid Atlético his buyout clause of 600 million pesetas. After a poor first season he became a regular, albeit as a substitute; in the final of the 2001–02 UEFA Champions League, in which he played the full 90 minutes, he was involved in the play that led to Zinedine Zidane's wonder strike against Bayer 04 Leverkusen, in an eventual 2–1 win.

Solari's best season with Real was 2003–04, but his five goals from 34 appearances – 15 starts, 1,539 minutes of action – could only help the side to the fourth position in the league. During his five-year spell he also played 49 matches in the Champions League, netting seven times.

Inter and later years
Solari signed a three-year contract with Inter Milan in the summer of 2005 for €6 million, being sparingly used during his three-year stint (maximum 21 games in his second season) but winning three consecutive Serie A titles to add to his trophy cabinet, the 2006 edition due to the Calciopoli scandal.

On 30 June 2008, Solari's contract with the Nerazzurri expired and he joined San Lorenzo de Almagro shortly after. On 9 July of the following year, he moved teams and countries again and signed with Atlante F.C. from Mexico, again on a free transfer.

In early September 2010, the 34-year-old Solari signed with Uruguayan club Peñarol for one year, yet again as a free agent. He retired after only a couple of months.

International
Solari won 11 caps for Argentina in five years. He was not selected for any major international tournaments, however.

Coaching career

Real Madrid
Solari started working as a manager in 2013, first being in charge of Real Madrid's youths. Ahead of the 2016–17 season, he was appointed at the reserves who competed in Segunda División B.

On 29 October 2018, Solari was named caretaker manager of the first team after the dismissal of Julen Lopetegui. He assumed the role the next day, and became the official coach 14 days later because in Spain no club was allowed to have a caretaker for more than two weeks. He won the FIFA Club World Cup during his tenure, extending Real's reign in the competition to three consecutive titles. 

Solari was sacked on 11 March 2019.

América
On 29 December 2020, Solari was unveiled as the new manager of Club América from Mexico after signing a two-year contract, replacing the fired Miguel Herrera. He did not obtain his work permit in time, and as a result could not be on the sideline for the team's opening match of the season against Atlético San Luis. He made his Liga MX debut the following week in a 1–0 away defeat to C.F. Monterrey, and earned his first win against FC Juárez on 26 January. He led the side to a second-place finish in the general table, but was eliminated in the quarter-finals by C.F. Pachuca.

América began the Apertura 2021 tournament with four victories and one draw from five matches, taking Solari's total tally with the club to 18 wins from his first 27 games, tying the mark set by Leo Beenhakker during the 1994–95 campaign. He guided them to the final of the CONCACAF Champions League in late October, losing 1–0 to Monterrey. The team finished the Apertura regular phase first in the table with 37 points, though once again falling at the quarter-final stage, being ousted by Club Universidad Nacional 3–1 on aggregate; they had managed to remain unbeaten at home throughout the 2021 calendar year (winning 13 and drawing three). 

Solari was dismissed on 2 March 2022, after a poor run of results.

Style of play
A dynamic and versatile winger, with excellent technical ability, Solari was mainly known for his dribbling skills, although he was also an accurate passer and was capable of striking the ball from distance with both feet.

Broadcasting
Since 2010, Solari worked as pundit for ESPN.

Personal life

Nicknamed Indiecito (Little Indian in Spanish), Solari came from a sporting family: his uncle Jorge, his father Eduardo and two of his four siblings, younger Esteban and David, were also footballers. His younger sister, Liz, worked as an actress.

His uncle Jorge played for several clubs during his career, mostly River Plate, whilst his cousin Natalia married Fernando Redondo who also represented Real Madrid. All but David played for Argentina.

Career statistics

Club

International

International goals
Argentina score listed first, score column indicates score after the Solari goal.

Managerial statistics

Honours

Player
River Plate
Argentine Primera División: Apertura 1996, Clausura 1997, Apertura 1997
Supercopa Sudamericana: 1997

Real Madrid
La Liga: 2000–01, 2002–03
Supercopa de España: 2001, 2003
UEFA Champions League: 2001–02
UEFA Super Cup: 2002
Intercontinental Cup: 2002

Inter Milan
Serie A: 2005–06, 2006–07, 2007–08
Coppa Italia: 2005–06
Supercoppa Italiana: 2005, 2006

Manager
Real Madrid
FIFA Club World Cup: 2018

América
CONCACAF Champions League runner-up: 2021

References

External links

Inter Milan profile

1976 births
Living people
Argentine people of Italian descent
Footballers from Rosario, Santa Fe
Argentine footballers
Association football midfielders
Stockton Ospreys men's soccer players
Argentine Primera División players
Newell's Old Boys footballers
Club Atlético River Plate footballers
San Lorenzo de Almagro footballers
La Liga players
Atlético Madrid footballers
Real Madrid CF players
Serie A players
Inter Milan players
Liga MX players
Atlante F.C. footballers
Uruguayan Primera División players
Peñarol players
UEFA Champions League winning players
Argentina international footballers
Argentine expatriate footballers
Expatriate soccer players in the United States
Expatriate footballers in Spain
Expatriate footballers in Italy
Expatriate footballers in Mexico
Expatriate footballers in Uruguay
Argentine expatriate sportspeople in the United States
Argentine expatriate sportspeople in Spain
Argentine expatriate sportspeople in Italy
Argentine expatriate sportspeople in Mexico
Argentine expatriate sportspeople in Uruguay
Argentine football managers
La Liga managers
Segunda División B managers
Real Madrid Castilla managers
Real Madrid CF managers
Liga MX managers
Club América managers
Argentine expatriate football managers
Expatriate football managers in Spain
Expatriate football managers in Mexico